is a former Japanese professional baseball pitcher who played for the Chunichi Dragons in Japan's Nippon Professional Baseball. He has been a pitching coach for the Dragons since 2003.

Kondō had a shortened career due to a consistent arm injury that forced him into early retirement.

On 8 August 1987, Kondō became the first player in Japanese baseball history to throw a no-hitter on debut in a 6-0 victory over the Yomiuri Giants.

He is the father of former Dragons outfielder, Hiroki Kondō.

See also
 Bumpus Jones
 List of Nippon Professional Baseball no-hitters

External links

Dragons.jp

References

1968 births
Living people
Baseball people from Aichi Prefecture
Japanese baseball players
Nippon Professional Baseball pitchers
Chunichi Dragons players
Japanese baseball coaches
Nippon Professional Baseball coaches
People from Ichinomiya, Aichi